Pi Delta Phi is the National French Honor Society—La Société d'Honneur de Français—for undergraduate and graduate students at accredited public and private colleges and universities in the United States.

Founded as a departmental honor society for French at the University of California, Berkeley in 1906, Pi Delta Phi is the oldest collegiate academic honor society for a modern foreign language in the United States. After many years as a local chapter, Pi Delta Phi reorganized and declared itself the National French Honor Society in 1920, and later chartered the Beta chapter at the University of Southern California in 1925, and the Gamma chapter at the University of California, Los Angeles, in 1926.

The society expanded slowly during the next fifteen years but enjoyed renewed interest after World War II. In 1949 the American Association of Teachers of French (AATF) endorsed the Society officially as the only collegiate French honor society in the United States. The society was admitted to membership in the Association of College Honor Societies in 1967. It currently numbers more than 406 chapters established at representative public and private colleges and universities in almost every state, as well as chapters in Paris and Aix-en-Provence.

Purpose
The purpose of the Society is:

(1) to recognize outstanding scholarship in the French language and francophone literatures,

(2) to increase the knowledge and appreciation of Americans for the cultural contributions of the French-speaking world, and

(3) to stimulate and to encourage French and francophone cultural activities.

Organization
The Society's Executive Board, composed of elected regional Vice Presidents, is chaired by an elected President who appoints the Executive Director and Digital Media Editor. All Board positions are volunteer. The official publication of Pi Delta Phi is the Newsletter. The Society awards annual scholarships for summer study in France and Québec to Regular undergraduate members of active chapters, and an annual graduate student research award for any study or research in a French-speaking country.

Membership
Regular members include undergraduate and graduate students at the sponsoring institution who are nominated in recognition of their academic achievement in French. Undergraduate or graduate candidates do not need to be French or French Studies majors or minors to be nominated for membership. The eligibility requirements for all undergraduate students are: completion of at least one course of upper division French (i.e. beyond the intermediate-level series of courses); 3.0 GPA in French, 3.0 GPA overall, AND rank in the top 35% of their class; and sophomore (second year) standing. Graduate students who are not already members of Pi Delta Phi are eligible for regular membership. The eligibility requirements for all graduate students are: completion of 2 graduate courses in French; and minimum 3.5 GPA in graduate coursework.

Honorary members include: the French faculty of the sponsoring institution who are not already members of Pi Delta Phi; members of the faculty at large who are not already members of the Society; undergraduate and graduate students who do not meet the above requirements for regular membership; college or university alumni who did not become members while attending the sponsoring institution; and diplomats, community and business leaders, and others who have demonstrated support of French language, and/or of the cultures and literatures of the French-speaking world.

Chapters
A list of all of the chapters of Pi Delta Phi is available on the organization's website.

See also
Société Honoraire de Français, the National French Honor Society (for high school students).

References

External links
 Pi Delta Phi
  ACHS Pi Delta Phi entry

Association of College Honor Societies
Honor societies
Student organizations established in 1906
Student societies in the United States
1906 establishments in California
French language